Priya Amar Priya is a 2008 Bangladeshi action romantic comedy film. The film directed by Badiul Alam Khokon and produced by Monir Hossain under the banner of Asha Production. The story of the film is written and screenplay by Puri Jagannadh  and the dialogue is written by Sachin Nag based on the pre-made film. It feature Shakib Khan and Sahara in the lead roles. Misha Sawdagor, Prabir Mitra, Rehana Jolly and Afzal Sharif played supporting roles in the film. The film is a remake of the 2002 Indian Kannada-language film Appu, which was later remade in Telugu as Idiot (2002), in Tamil as Dum (2003) and in Bengali as Hero (2006). The film was released in Bangladesh on June 13, 2008. Shakib Khan won Meril-Prothom Alo Awards for Best Actor, Euro-CJFB Performance Awards and Channel I Performance Awards for his performance in the film.

Plot
Hridoy is the son of a Police head constable Rahmat Ali. Hridoy is a guy with a carefree attitude. He is beaten by a rival gang at night and was rescued by a beautiful girl Priya Chowdhury. She pays his hospital bills and donates her blood. She is gone from the hospital by the time Hridoy became conscious. When Hridoy's friends inform him about the girl who rescued him, he starts loving her immediately for her goodheartedness, though he did not see her. Priya later turns out to be the sister of the city police commissioner Rashed Rayhan Chowdhury.

Hridoy meets Priya in the college for the first time and expresses his love. When she does not agree, he tries to tease her. She complains to her brother, and he takes Hridoy to the police station and severely beats him before being rescued by his father and his fellow constables. Even though Hridoy is beaten by Rashed Rayhan Chowdhury, he becomes more adamant to win his ladylove. He proposes to Priya again in the college. She asks him to jump from the building. When he is ready to do so, she agrees to his love.

However, Rashed Rayhan Chowdhury is not happy about their relationship and ropes in some rowdies to amputate his leg. Priya learns about this and runs to help him, but is met with an accident. Both of them get admitted to the same hospital, and they unite there also. Rashed Rayhan Chowdhury finally arranges her marriage with another person, to which she openly opposes and tries to commit suicide. Priya comes and rescues her, but Rashed Rayhan Chowdhury still wants to get her married to a man of his own choice. He also engages goons to kill Hridoy. Priya finally escapes all the troubles and meets the Bangladesh Police IG to help him to marry his love. The IG finally suspends Rashed Rayhan Chowdhury and arranges Hridoy's marriage in the police station. Finally, Hridoy appears for Bangladesh Civil Service and is selected for Bangladesh Police.

Cast
 Shakib Khan as Hridoy
 Sahara as Priya
 Misha Sawdagor as Rashed Rayhan Chowdhury, police Commissioner, Priya's brother
 Prabir Mitra as Rahmat Ali, police constable, Hridoy's father
 Rehana Jolly as Hridoy's mother
 Mehedi as Asif, Hridoy's friend
 Madhuri as Lata, Hridoy's sister
 Afzal Sharif as Babu, Hridoy's friend
 Boby as Theatre owner
 Ilias Kobra as Commissioner's goon
 Siraj Haider as IG, Bangladesh Police (special appearance)

Production
The lead actor Shakib Khan took a salary 1.5 lakh for his role in the film. He signed a contract with Asha Productions with signing money of Tk 25,000 on February 14, 2006.

Filming began on December 25, 2006 and The film was shot in a few lots. The film was complete in late 2007.

Soundtrack

The film soundtrack is composed by Ali Akram Shuvo and all the song written by Kabir Bakul. A total of five songs have been used in the film.

Release
The release on June 13, 2008 in 33 theatre in all around the country.

Reception
The film was one of blockbuster hit among Bangladeshi films released in 2008. The film was making with 5 million. The film grossed 150 million at the box office, making it the second highest grossing Bangladeshi film.

Awards

References

External links
 

2008 action comedy films
2008 films
2008 romantic comedy films
Bengali-language Bangladeshi films
Bangladeshi action comedy films
Bangladeshi romantic comedy films
Bangladeshi remakes of Indian films
Films scored by Ali Akram Shuvo
Films set in universities and colleges
2000s Bengali-language films